KJMK (93.9 FM) is a classic hits radio station broadcasting from Joplin, Missouri, with an effective radiated power of 48,000 watts.

KJMK used to be a part of the family-owned Zimmer Radio Group. The stations were sold in July 2007 to James Zimmer and he created a new company called Zimmer Radio, Inc.

History
This station started out as "KIX 94 FM", a country station. Later, KIX (KIXQ) was moved down the dial to 102.5 FM, replacing another country station, Country KAT (KJKT), at that frequency. The station was relaunched as an AC station, "Magic 93.9". Later, the station transitioned to "Lite Rock 93.9".

On March 2, 2012, KJMK changed their format to classic hits, branded as "Classic Hits 93.9". This leaves Joplin without an adult contemporary station other than KDMO in nearby Carthage, and the weaker signals from KGLC in Miami, Oklahoma, and KBVA in Bella Vista, Arkansas.

External links

JMK